The Delwood Community School District is a public school district headquartered in Delmar, Iowa.  The district is mostly in Clinton County, with a small area in Jackson County, and serves the town of Delmar and the surrounding rural areas.

Todd Hawley became superintendent of both Delwood and Midland Community School District in 2019.

Schools
The district operates a single elementary school in Delmar:
 Delwood Elementary School

Students from Delwood attend secondary school at Maquoketa.

References

External links
 Delwood Community School District

School districts in Iowa
Education in Jackson County, Iowa